Dunbar is an unincorporated community, census-designated place, and coal town located in Wise County, Virginia, United States. It was first listed as a CDP in the 2020 census with a population of 79.

References

Unincorporated communities in Wise County, Virginia
Unincorporated communities in Virginia
Census-designated places in Wise County, Virginia
Census-designated places in Virginia
Coal towns in Virginia